C. arvense may refer to:

 Cerastium arvense, the field chickweed, a flowering plant species
 Cirsium arvense, a plant species native throughout Europe and northern Asia and widely introduced elsewhere

See also
 Arvense (disambiguation)